Nephropsis is a genus of lobsters containing 15 extant species:

Nephropsis acanthura Macpherson, 1990
Nephropsis aculeata Smith, 1881
Nephropsis agassizii A. Milne-Edwards, 1880
Nephropsis atlantica Norman, 1882
Nephropsis carpenteri Wood-Mason, 1885
Nephropsis ensirostris Alcock, 1901
Nephropsis holthuisii Macpherson, 1993
Nephropsis malhaensis Borradaile, 1910
Nephropsis neglecta Holthuis, 1974
Nephropsis occidentalis Faxon, 1893
Nephropsis rosea Bate, 1888
Nephropsis serrata Macpherson, 1993
Nephropsis stewarti Wood-Mason, 1872
Nephropsis suhmi Bate, 1888
Nephropsis sulcata Macpherson, 1990

One further fossil species has also been described.

References

True lobsters